Ravi Bishnoi (born 5 September 2000) is an Indian international cricketer. He plays for the Indian cricket team in white ball cricket. He is a Right-arm leg-break bowler. He made his International debut in February 2022. He plays for Lucknow Super Giants in the Indian Premier League and Rajasthan in domestic cricket. He first came in limelight when he played for India in the 2020 Under-19 Cricket World Cup, finishing as the tournament's highest wicket-taker with 17 dismissals.

Early life
Ravi Bishnoi was born and raised in Marwari Bishnoi Family in the Birami village of Jodhpur, Rajasthan. Due to the lack of cricket culture and facilities in West Rajasthan, he, along with his friends and with the help of two coaches built a cricket academy named Spartans Cricket Academy where they themselves did all the mason work owing to financial difficulties so that he could train. He was snubbed for the U-16 trials once and for the U-19 trial twice by the selectors before his coaches asked them to give him another chance and finally got selected for the U-19 Rajasthan squad. In March 2018, he was called up by Rajasthan Royals as a net bowler.

Domestic career
He made his Twenty20 debut for Rajasthan in the 2018–19 Syed Mushtaq Ali Trophy on 21 February 2019. He made his List A debut on 27 September 2019, for Rajasthan in the 2019–20 Vijay Hazare Trophy. In October 2019, he was named in India A's squad for the 2019–20 Deodhar Trophy.

Indian Premier League
In December 2019, in the 2020 IPL auction, he was bought by Kings XI Punjab ahead of the 2020 Indian Premier League. On 20 September 2020, Bishnoi made his IPL debut against Delhi Capitals and picked up Rishabh Pant as his maiden wicket and finished with the bowling figures 1/22 in four overs, but ended up on the losing side. He finished the season with 12 wickets and was nominated for the Emerging Player award.

In February 2022, Bishnoi was drafted in by the new franchise Lucknow Super Giants ahead of the 2022 Indian Premier League tournament.

International career
In December 2019, he was named in India's squad for the 2020 Under-19 Cricket World Cup. On 21 January 2020, in India's match against Japan, Bishnoi took four wickets without conceding a run, before finishing his spell with four wickets for five runs from eight overs, with India winning by ten wickets, and he was named the man of the match. He finished the tournament as the leading wicket-taker.

In January 2022, Bishnoi was named in India's One Day International (ODI) and Twenty20 International (T20I) squads for their home series against the West Indies. He made his T20I debut on 16 February 2022, for India against the West Indies cricket team, taking two wickets for 17 runs and being named the player of the match. In October 2022, he was named in India's ODI squad, for their series against South Africa. He made his ODI debut on 6 October 2022 against the South Africa.

References

External links
 

2000 births
Living people
Indian cricketers
Rajasthani people
India Twenty20 International cricketers
India One Day International cricketers
Rajasthan cricketers
Punjab Kings cricketers
Lucknow Super Giants cricketers
People from Jodhpur